Pontrhyd-Saeson is a hamlet in the  community of Dyffryn Arth, Ceredigion, Wales, which is 66.9 miles (107.7 km) from Cardiff and 178.4 miles (287 km) from London. Pontsaeson is represented in the Senedd by Elin Jones (Plaid Cymru) and is part of the Ceredigion constituency in the House of Commons.

References

See also
List of localities in Wales by population 

Villages in Ceredigion